Robin Sen was an Indian politician belonging to the Communist Party of India (Marxist). He was elected to the Lok Sabha, lower house of the Parliament of India from Asansol in 1971 and 1977.

References

External links
  Official biographical sketch in Parliament of India website

1932 births
Communist Party of India (Marxist) politicians from West Bengal
People from Asansol
India MPs 1971–1977
India MPs 1977–1979
Lok Sabha members from West Bengal
Living people